The Privileged District of Velika Kikinda ( / Velikokikindski privilegovani dištrikt; ;) was an administrative territorial entity of the Habsburg monarchy between 1774 and 1876. It was an autonomous area centered around the town of Velika Kikinda (today Kikinda, Serbia), and mainly inhabited by ethnic Serbs.

History

It was formed on 12 November 1774 by the decision of Habsburg Empress Maria Theresa, through the special charter, as the specific feudal governmental administrative unit with headquarters in Velika Kikinda (today Kikinda, Serbia). Inhabitants of the District had, for that period, substantial economic, and even political privileges within the Habsburg monarchy.

Until 1778, the District of Velika Kikinda was part of the Banat of Temeswar (a separate Habsburg land), and then part of the Torontal County within the Habsburg Kingdom of Hungary. In 1848-1849 it was part of autonomous Serbian Vojvodina, and from 1849 to 1860 it was part of the Voivodeship of Serbia and Banat of Temeschwar, a separate Austrian crown land. After abolishment of the Voivodeship in 1860, territory of the District of Velika Kikinda was again included into Torontal County.

The District functioned, with some interruptions, until 1876 when it was abolished, and its territory was allocated both organizationally and administratively to the direct authority of the Torontal County with the headquarters in Veliki Bečkerek (today Zrenjanin, Serbia), which covered most of the territory of the present-day Serbian Banat.

Settlements
Beside the town of Velika Kikinda, the district included nine more settlements of the Serb Military Frontier establishments in North and Central Banat: 
Srpski Krstur 
Jozefovo (today part of Novi Kneževac) 
Mokrin 
Karlovo (today part of Novo Miloševo)
Bašaid 
Vranjevo (today part of Novi Bečej) 
Melenci 
Kumane
Taraš

References

Notes

Sources
Jovan M. Pejin, Iz prošlosti Kikinde, Kikinda, 2000.
Dr Dušan J. Popović, Srbi u Vojvodini, knjiga 2, Novi Sad, 1990.

See also
District of Potisje

Kikinda
History of Banat
Vojvodina under Habsburg rule
Banat of Temeswar
1774 establishments in the Habsburg monarchy
1876 disestablishments in Austria-Hungary